Sicciaemorpha is a genus of moths in the subfamily Arctiinae. It contains seven species, which are found in eastern Asia.

Species 
Sicciaemorpha danepan Volynkin & Černý, 2021
Sicciaemorpha ivyalba van Eecke, 1920
Sicciaemorpha langgona Volynkin & Černý, 2021
Sicciaemorpha nebulibia Volynkin & Černý, 2021
Sicciaemorpha pleiadina Volynkin & Černý, 2021
Sicciaemorpha reducta Volynkin & Černý, 2021
Sicciaemorpha yumun Volynkin & Černý, 2021

References

Lithosiini